The Immortals are a band consisting of Belgian electronic musicians Maurice "Praga Khan" Engelen and Olivier Adams, best known for their work in the controversial techno/industrial dance/New Beat band Lords of Acid.

The side project was created for the first Mortal Kombat soundtrack in 1994; however, they debuted their track "Techno Syndrome (Mortal Kombat)" in 1993 when it was released as a single. The song was used as part of the Mortal Kombat commercial for the home systems that announced its single release as well. It was also used in TV commercials for the Mortal Kombat movie and Mortal Kombat: Live Tour, and it was released the same year when the game was released for home consoles. The track has also subsequently become known as "the Mortal Kombat theme song" and has appeared for a set of remixes of the JX track "Close To Your Heart".  The original music was mixed with sound effects from the Mortal Kombat arcade game to create "Techno Syndrome (7" Mix)".

Discography

Albums
 Mortal Kombat: The Album (1994)
 Mortal Kombat (soundtrack) (1995) 
 Mortal Kombat: Annihilation (soundtrack) (1997)

Singles

References

External links
Praga Khan
Lords of Acid
:nl:Olivier Adams

Belgian techno music groups
Belgian house music groups
Belgian dance music groups
Acid house groups